The Akamia museum is a museum located  in Antsirabe, Madagascar. It is located in the Academie Militaire Antsirabe.

References

Museums in Antsirabe